The 1946 Boston Braves season was the 76th in the history of the Major League Baseball franchise, and its 71st season as a charter member of the National League. In finishing 81–72 (.529) and in fourth place, the Braves enjoyed their most successful year since 1933, and signaled the post-World War II renaissance of the franchise under its new ownership group, headed by Louis R. Perini, and its Baseball Hall of Fame manager, Billy Southworth, in his first year at the Boston helm after departing the St. Louis Cardinals.

Regular season 
The Braves' home schedule began on an inauspicious note April 16. Perini and his partners had invested $500,000 in refurbishing Braves Field, lowering the playing surface to improve sight lines, installing lights for night baseball, and applying a fresh coat of green paint to the wooden grandstands. But colder than expected April weather foiled their plans. The club's home opener, against the Brooklyn Dodgers, attracted 19,482 fans, who witnessed a 5–3 Boston victory. However, some 13,000 of those fans were dismayed to discover that their clothing was smeared with green paint, still wet, from their grandstand seats. The seats eventually dried out, as the Braves went on an early-season road trip punctuated by a Sunday doubleheader played at Fenway Park, home of the American League Red Sox.

On the other hand, the first-ever MLB night game to be played in the city of Boston, on May 11 against the New York Giants, was an off-field success. The contest, on a Saturday night, drew 37,407 fans to Braves Field—the team's largest crowd since 1933—with the home side sporting satin uniforms, specially designed to glow under the arc lights of night baseball. On the field, however, the Giants' Monte Kennedy outpitched Boston's Johnny Sain, 5–1.

Despite his May 11 setback, Sain was the Braves' leading pitcher, winning 20 games and posting a superb 2.21 earned run average, second-best in the National League. Although a poor May and June doomed their pennant chances, a strong 36–23 mark during August and September enabled the Braves to claim the final spot in the first division, only one game out of third place.

Season standings

Record vs. opponents

Roster

Player stats

Batting

Starters by position 
Note: Pos = Position; G = Games played; AB = At bats; H = Hits; Avg. = Batting average; HR = Home runs; RBI = Runs batted in

Other batters 
Note: G = Games played; AB = At bats; H = Hits; Avg. = Batting average; HR = Home runs; RBI = Runs batted in

Pitching

Starting pitchers 
Note: G = Games pitched; IP = Innings pitched; W = Wins; L = Losses; ERA = Earned run average; SO = Strikeouts

Other pitchers 
Note: G = Games pitched; IP = Innings pitched; W = Wins; L = Losses; ERA = Earned run average; SO = Strikeouts

Relief pitchers 
Note: G = Games pitched; W = Wins; L = Losses; SV = Saves; ERA = Earned run average; SO = Strikeouts

Farm system 

LEAGUE CHAMPIONS: Evansville, Raleigh, Owensboro

Notes

References 
1946 Boston Braves at Baseball Reference

Boston Braves seasons
Boston Braves
Boston Braves
1940s in Boston